The 2006–07 Australian Figure Skating Championships was held in Brisbane from 19 through 26 August 2006. Skaters competed in the disciplines of men's singles, ladies' singles, ice dancing, and synchronized skating across many levels, including senior, junior, novice, adult, and the pre-novice disciplines of primary and intermediate.

Senior results

Men

Ladies

Ice dancing

Synchronized

External links
 2006–07 Australian Figure Skating Championships results

2006 in figure skating
2007 in figure skating
Fig
Fig
Australian Figure Skating Championships